The 2001 Women's Professional Softball League season was the first year that the WPSL suspended play before relaunching the league in 2004 under the name National Pro Fastpitch.  From 1997, WPSL operated under the names Women's Pro Fastpitch (WPF) and Women's Pro Softball League (WPSL).

Teams
When the WPSL suspended the 2001 season, there were four teams in the league: Tampa Bay FireStix, Akron Racers, Ohio Pride, and Florida Wahoos.  When the league relaunched in 2004 as the NPF, the Racers were the only WPSL team to continue playing.

Milestones and Events
The 2001 year began as normally scheduled for the WPSL.  The league had its draft in December 2000 and had a schedule for the upcoming season.  However, on February 27, 2001, WPSL announced that the 2001 had been cancelled, and the league would focus on expansion for a league relaunch in 2002. (The relaunch was eventually postponed until 2004.)   To maintain public awareness of the league and to test future markets for expansion, in lieu of a WPSL season the league sponsored the  "Tour of Fastpitch Champions"  during the summer, featuring a team of WPSL All-Stars against a team of USA and international Olympians, called WPSL Gold.

The WPSL announced a plan to restart play in "six to eight markets in 2002, with growth to 12 markets by 2004."  The tour moved through 14 cities, as the two WPSL teams played each other and other international and local all-stars.  Ten of these games were televised, eight on ESPN2 and two "live" on ESPN, a first for the WPSL.  In 2002, the league continued to explore where its new teams would play, and had a 2003 tour as an opener to the return of league play in 2004.

College Draft

Before play was suspended, WPSL held their regularly scheduled 2001 WPSL Senior Draft.  Many draftees never played in the league, but some did, even making an All-Star team.  These results are indicated below.

Draft Selections

Round 1

Round 2

Round 3

Round 4

Round 5

Round 6

Tour Rosters
The rosters of the 2001 WPSL All-Stars and WPSL Gold are listed below:

WPSL Gold

Head Coach: Judy Martino

WPSL All-Stars

Head Coach: Tim Kiernan

Tour Schedule and Results

WPSL Gold schedule and results:

WPSL All-Stars schedule and results:

Game notes

References

External links

See also

 List of professional sports leagues
 List of professional sports teams in the United States and Canada

Softball teams
Softball in the United States
Pro Softball League season
Soft